Charalambos "Bambos" Xanthos is a  Greek Cypriot hotel and restaurant owner based in London, England. Following on from being a backgammon player, he became a semi-professional poker player in 1993.

Xanthos learnt poker from his father in 1960.

He made numerous appearances in the Late Night Poker television series, and reached the grand final in series 2 (beating Victoria Coren's pocket aces along the way) and the semi-final in series 5.

Xanthos has made more final tables at the Grosvenor Victoria Casino than any other player.

He does not tend to play in tournaments outside Europe. As of 2015, his total live tournament winnings exceed $1,100,000.

References

British people of Greek Cypriot descent
Poker players from London
English backgammon players
Living people
Year of birth missing (living people)